Hrubieszów revolution  or Hrubeshivshchyna  — tragic episode of the Polish-Ukrainian military conflict in the Chełm Land during the Second World War.

History 
In March 1944, the Polish underground state carried out a large-scale anti-Ukrainian operation, which went down in history as the "Hrubieszów Revolution." The name was used by the Polish side as a collective definition of repressive, retaliatory measures against the Ukrainian population of Hrubieszów County.

It was initiated by the commander of the Home Army in the Hrubieszów region, Marian Golembiowski, later one of the most ardent supporters of Polish-Ukrainian cooperation, a participant in negotiations with the UPA. During March 10–11, Polish units attacked the villages of Andriyivka, Bereziv, Brest, Wereszyn, Laskiv, Malychi, Malkiv, Modryn, Myagke, Novosilky, Rzeplin, Sagryn, Stryzhyvets, Terebinets, Turkovychi, and Shikhovychi, burning them in whole or in part.

The anti-Ukrainian actions of the spring of 1944 in the Kholm region were not accidental, but planned. They were part of the Polish underground operation and attempts to block the spread of OUN and UPA influences. The Hrubieszów revolution aimed to cut off the Kholm region from Galicia, thus preventing the spread of the Ukrainian movement.

The course of events and consequences 
The Polish offensive was not limited to those days and lasted for the next few weeks. The document entitled "List of destruction of villages by Polish bandits in Hrubieszów region" states that for the period from March 10 to April 5, 36 Ukrainian villages were destroyed and 875 people were murdered. A review of the events of March–April 1944 states that "about 2,000 Ukrainian peasants, mostly women and children, were killed during the March actions in Poland." The Ukrainian Auxiliary Committee compiled lists of those killed in the spring of 1944 and was able to identify 1,283 victims killed between March 10 and May 10.

According to Igor Hałagida's findings, based on the data collected, at least 1,264 people were killed and eight were injured that day alone (March 10); 4 of them were fatal; the total number of wounded is not clearly established. The vast majority were peasants, and among all the victims there were as many as 502 women (495 killed, 4 mortally wounded and 3 wounded) and 292 children (291 killed and 1 wounded).

In the following days, the Polish action was continued in other villages of Hrubieszów County. Among others, on March 11, Andriyivka was attacked (32 killed, including 7 women and 12 children), on March 13, Kryliv (12 killed, including 3 women and 3 children), and once again Modryn (26 killed, including 12 women and 1 child), March 18 Zhabche (23 killed, including 11 women and 2 children), March 21 Berest (235 killed, 1 mortally wounded and 3 wounded; among those killed were 104 women and 50 children) and Vereshin (37 killed, of which 19 women and 2 children), on March 22 Lisky (62 killed, including at least 16 women and 9 children), and on April 2 Novosilky (148 people were killed, including 68 women and 18 children). In total, during the anti-Ukrainian action, the Polish underground burned at least 35 Ukrainian villages in Hrubieszów County (in whole or in part). Between March 9–10 and April 2, 1944, at least 1,969 Ukrainians were killed by non-Germans in one county alone, including at least 769 women and 348 children, 6 were mortally wounded, and only one Ukrainian died by the hands of the Ukrainian underground state.

At the end of March, the territory of Kholmshchyna had a terrible appearance. Here is how Volodymyr Levytsky, a representative of the UCC in Lublin, describes his impressions of what he saw in a letter dated April 1, 1944:

See also 

 Sahryń massacre
 Attack on Hrubieszów
 Ethnic cleansing of Zamojszczyzna by Nazi Germany

References

Sources 

 В'ятрович В. За лаштунками "Волині-43. Невідома польсько-українська війна. — Харків : Клуб сімейного дозвілля; Центр дослідження визвольного руху, 2016. — 304 с.
 Hałagida I. Ukrainskie straty osobowe w dystrykcie lubelskim (pażdziernik 1939 — lipiec 1944) — wstępna analiza materiału statystycznego // Pameęć i sprawiedliwość. Pismo naukowe poświęncone historii najnowszej. — Warszawa, 2017. — No. 1 (29). — S. 381–384. (пол.)

1944 in Europe
History of Poland
Zakerzonia
Polish war crimes
Massacres of Ukrainians by Poles